This is a list of nature centers and environmental education centers in the state of Georgia.

To use the sortable tables: click on the icons at the top of each column to sort that column in alphabetical order; click again for reverse alphabetical order.

Resources
 Environmental Education in Georgia
 Environmental Education Alliance of Georgia

External links
 Map of nature centers and environmental education centers in Georgia

 
Nature centers
Georgia